Acacia kulnurensis, commonly known as the Kulnura wattle, is a species of Acacia native to eastern Australia.

Description
It blooms between March and September producing yellow flowers. The loosely packed spherical flower-heads contain 5 to eleven cream to pale yellow coloured flowers. The seed pods that form between September and December.

Distribution
It has a limited distribution on the central coast of New South Wales where it is found mostly in the Kulnara to Bucketty and Mangrove Mountain areas extending northward to north to the Hunter Valley area around Kurri Kurri and Cessnock. It is usually situated on ridges and upper slopes in and around sandstone outcrops as a part of dry sclerophyll woodland or forest communities.

See also
 List of Acacia species

References

kulnurensis
Fabales of Australia
Flora of New South Wales